Asprochoma ("white soil") is a village in Messenia, Greece. It is part of the municipality Kalamata.

Populated places in Messenia